The Commonwealth Railways D class were a class of 4-4-0 construction and shunting locomotives built in 1880 by Beyer, Peacock and Company originally for the New South Wales Government Railways and later the Commonwealth Railways.

History 
Construction started on a new line which went from Kalgoorlie to Port Augusta however a need for more motive power was required and so the New South Wales Government Railways  started negotiating with the Commonwealth Railways. The NSWGR had introduced their Q Class in 1880 originally as 4-4-0 side tank engines but due to excessive axle loads they were converted by the NSWGR into tender engines with 6 wheel tenders. There were 6 of them bought originally for suburban passenger work they were now surplus to requirements. So the Commonwealth Railways purchased 4 locomotives in October 1912 at the cost of £4,700. The remaining 2 were purchased soon after. All six locomotives were given automatic couplers prior to entering service but all retained their original NSWGR number. They were also reclassed as 'D'. In 1913 and 1914 the class had many problems with cracking gauge glasses and tubes blowing which slowed the progress of the construction of the Trans-Australian Line. Many more problems followed such as broken stays, side rod brasses, axle box brasses and the need for many of the class to be re-tubed this resulted in most of that class spending a lot of time in the workshops at Port Augusta. When the G/GA class was introduced the D class were relegated to shunting duties.

Withdrawal 
In the 1920s, all the D class were withdrawn but not scrapped except for D162, which was withdrawn in July 1943. The D class started being scrapped in 1958, with the last D class number 163 being scrapped on 26 March 1959.

Class list

References 

D class
Railway locomotives introduced in 1913
Beyer, Peacock locomotives
4-4-0 locomotives
Standard gauge locomotives of Australia
Scrapped locomotives
Passenger locomotives